Yousef Vakia is an Iranian football defender who currently plays for Iranian football club Shahr Khodrou in the Persian Gulf Pro League.

Club career

Foolad
He started his career with Foolad from youth levels. Later he joined to first team by Hossein Faraki. He made his debut for Foolad in the first fixture of the 2014–15 Iran Pro League against Tractor Sazi as a starter.

Club career statistics

International career

U17

He played two marches at the 2010 Asian U16 Championships.

U20
He was part of Iran U–20 during 2012 AFC U-19 Championship qualification, 2012 CIS Cup, 2012 AFF U-19 Youth Championship and 2012 AFC U-19 Championship.

U23
He invited to Iran U-23 training camp by Nelo Vingada to preparation for Incheon 2014 and 2016 AFC U-22 Championship (Summer Olympic qualification). He named in Iran U23 final list for Incheon 2014.

Honours
Foolad
Iran Pro League (1): 2013–14

References

External links
Yousef Vakia at PersianLeague.com
 Yousef Vakia at IranLeague.ir

1993 births
Living people
Iranian footballers
People from Andimeshk
Foolad FC players
Persian Gulf Pro League players
Iran under-20 international footballers
Association football defenders
Footballers at the 2014 Asian Games
Asian Games competitors for Iran
Gol Gohar players
Sportspeople from Khuzestan province